"Lights Out" is a song by Contemporary Christian-Rock-Pop rock- band Silverline from their first studio album, Lights Out. It was released on February 19, 2013 by Reach Records, as the first single from the album. The song was produced by Ben Kasica.

Background 
The song was produced by Ben Kasica, and the song was co-written by Ryan Edberg, Ben Kasica, Chris Semel, Jonathan Steingard.

Release 
"Lights Out" was digitally released as the lead single from Lights Out on February 19, 2013 by Reach Records.

Videos

Music 

Weekly Charts

References 

2013 singles
2013 songs